Reflections in a Golden Eye may refer to:

 Reflections in a Golden Eye (novel), a 1941 novel by Carson McCullers
 Reflections in a Golden Eye (film), a 1967 film adaptation directed by John Huston

de:Spiegelbild im goldenen Auge
es:Reflejos de un ojo dorado
fr:Reflets dans un œil d'or
nl:Reflections in a Golden Eye